The men's welterweight event was part of the boxing programme at the 1984 Summer Olympics. The weight class allowed boxers of up to 67 kilograms to compete. The competition was held from 29 July to 11 August 1984. 36 boxers from 36 nations competed.

Medalists

Results
The following boxers took part in the event:

First round
 Genaro Léon (MEX) def. Daniel Dominguez (ARG), 5:0
 Mark Breland (USA) def. Wayne Gordon (CAN), 5:0
 An Young-Su (KOR) def. Abock Shoah (SUD), 5:0
 Rudel Obreja (ROU) def. Antoine Loungoude (RCA), KO-1
 Michael Hughes (GBR) def. Paul Rasamimanana (MDG), 5:0

Second round
 Joni Nyman (FIN) def. Georges Ngangue (CMR), 5:0
 Kieran Joyce (IRL) def. Basil Boniface (SEY), RSC-2
 Kitenge Kitangawa (ZAI) def. Lefa Tsapi (LES), RSC-1
 Dwight Frazier (JAM) def. Francisco Lisboa (INA), 5:0
 Bernard Wilson (GRN) def. Roland Omoruyi (NGR), RSC-3
 Vesa Koskela (SWE) def. Abrar Husain Syed (PAK), 4:1
 Vedat Önsöy (TUR) def. Saikoloni Hala (TNG), 5:0
 Kamel Abboud (ALG) def. Henry Kalunga (ZAM), 5:0
 Alexander Künzler (FRG) def. Mohamed Ali Aldahan (SYR), 5:0
 Peter Okumu (UGA) def. Neya Mkadala (TNZ), 3:2
 Luciano Bruno (ITA) def. Georges Bosco (BEN), 5:0
 Khemais Refai (TUN) def. Konrad König (AUT), RSC-1
 Genaro Léon (MEX) def. Akinobu Hiranaka (JPN), 5:0
 Mark Breland (USA) def. Carlos Reyes (PUR), RSC-3
 Rudel Obreja (ROU) def. Michael Hughes (GBR), 5:0

Third round
 Joni Nyman (FIN) def. Kieran Joyce (IRL), 4:1
 Dwight Frazier (JAM) def. Kitenge Kitangawa (ZAI), 3:2
 Vesa Koskela (SWE) def. Bernard Wilson (GRN), KO-3
 An Young-Su (KOR) def. Vedat Önsöy (TUR), 5:0
 Alexander Küzler (FRG) def. Kamel Abboud (ALG), 4:1
 Luciano Bruno (ITA) def. Peter Okumu (UGA), 4:1
 Genaro Léon (MEX) def. Khemais Refai (TUN), 3:2
 Mark Breland (USA) def. Rudel Obreja (ROU), 5:0

Quarterfinals
 Joni Nyman (FIN) def. Dwight Frazier (JAM), 5:0
 An Young-Su (KOR) def. Vesa Koskela (SWE), 5:0
 Luciano Bruno (ITA) def. Alexander Künzler (FRG), 5:0
 Mark Breland (USA) def. Genaro Léon (MEX), KO-1

Semifinals
 An Young-Su (KOR) def. Joni Nyman (FIN), 3:2
 Mark Breland (USA) def. Luciano Bruno (ITA), 5:0

Final
 Mark Breland (USA) def. An Young-Su (KOR), 5:0

References

Welterweight